Atanygnathus is a genus of beetles belonging to the family Staphylinidae.

The genus was first described by Jakobson in 1909.

The genus has cosmopolitan distribution.

Species:
 Atanygnathus terminalis (Erichson, 1839)

References

Staphylininae
Staphylinidae genera